Searching for Heritage is an album that John Butler recorded and sold on cassette tapes while he was busking on the streets of Fremantle in 1996. It is a collection of instrumental songs, some of which ("Ocean" and "Valley") were re-recorded on the debut self-titled album John Butler. During this time, Butler was usually playing on his own.  Completely self-funded, it sold three and a half thousand copies and enabled Butler to fund his first CD recording.

The tape is highly sought-after by collectors since it was out of print of many years, with some copies only found second-hand at music stores. The tape was never reissued after the initial release.

To celebrate the Searching for Heritage's 20th anniversary in 2016, the album was reissued in a vinyl edition, which sold out in 36 hours, and also in several downloadable 24-bit lossless audio formats.

Track listing
All tracks written and performed by John Butler.

Original Cassette Tape

Side One

 River Song
 Valley
 Desert Snow
 Some Place Familiar
 Newd
 Chicken

Side Two

 River Song (Busk version)
 Desert Snow (8 Track)
 Valley (DAT)
 Long Trek
 Ocean

2016 Vinyl Reissue

Side One

 River Song
 Valley
 Desert Snow
 Some Place Familiar
 Newd
 Chicken

Side Two

 River Song (busk version)
 Desert Snow (8 track)
 Valley (dat)
 Long Trek
 Ocean

2016 Digital Reissue 

River Song
 Valley
 Desert Snow
 Some Place Familiar
Newd
River Song (busk version)
 Desert Snow (8 track)
 Valley (dat)
Long Trek

References

John Butler Trio albums
1996 live albums
Self-released albums